Éwerton Ribeiro Páscoa or simply Éwerton Páscoa (born 14 March 1989) is a Brazilian footballer who currently plays for Brazilian club Esporte Clube Vitória.

Club career

Audax
Ewerton began his footballing career on Audax, being included in the first team on late 2009. He then played for Audax in 2010 and 2011 Série A2.

Guarani
In 2011, Ewerton was loaned to Guarani. He played in Série B for Bugre, scoring once and appearing 20 times (18 as a starter).

Santos
After a good Campeonato Paulista de 2012, many clubs shown interesting to contract Ewerton Páscoa. On 18 May 2012, Ewerton signed a one-year loan deal with Santos.

Criciúma

On 19 December 2012, after being left out in Muricy Ramalho's plans for 2013 season, Páscoa left Santos and signed a one-year loan deal with Criciúma, until the end of 2013 season.

Career statistics

Honours
Santos
Recopa Sudamericana: 2012

Sport Recife
Copa do Nordeste: 2014

References

External links

1989 births
Living people
Footballers from São Paulo
Brazilian footballers
Grêmio Osasco Audax Esporte Clube players
Guarani FC players
Santos FC players
Criciúma Esporte Clube players
Sport Club do Recife players
Red Bull Brasil players
Esporte Clube São Bento players
Clube de Regatas Brasil players
Campeonato Brasileiro Série A players
Campeonato Brasileiro Série B players
Association football defenders